Luiz Felipe Machado de Oliveira (born 31 August 1997), commonly known as Felipinho, is a Brazilian footballer who currently plays as a forward for Bahia.

Career statistics

Club

Notes

References

1997 births
Living people
Brazilian footballers
Association football forwards
Esporte Clube Tigres do Brasil players
Villa Nova Atlético Clube players
Clube Atlético Mineiro players
Campeonato Brasileiro Série D players